is a former Japanese football player.

Club career
Okubo made a total of 150 appearances in the J.League playing for Tokushima Vortis, Sanfrecce Hiroshima, Kyoto Sanga FC and Tochigi SC.

National team career
In 2002, Okubo represented the Japan national under-19's in the 2002 AFC Youth Championship in Qatar.

Club statistics

References

External links

 Profile at JEF United Chiba

1984 births
Living people
People from Ichihara, Chiba
Association football people from Chiba Prefecture
Japanese footballers
J1 League players
J2 League players
Sanfrecce Hiroshima players
Kyoto Sanga FC players
Tochigi SC players
Tokushima Vortis players
Matsumoto Yamaga FC players
JEF United Chiba players
Association football defenders